Hexes is the plural of Hex.

Hexes may also refer to:

Hexes, a book by Tom Piccirilli, 1999 nominee for the Bram Stoker Award for Novel
Hexes (climbing), items of rock climbing equipment used to protect climbers from injury during a fall
 Hexes and Ohs, a Canadian electronic indie pop group from Montreal
 Hexes for Exes, a 2007 album by Moving Units, their third release
 Strange Hexes, the second album released by Imaad Wasif, and the first with backing band Two Part Beast. It was self-released in 2008. Several of the songs, such as "Oceanic," were written while on tour with the Yeah Yeah Yeahs